The 2018–19 Prairie View A&M Panthers basketball team represents Prairie View A&M University during the 2018–19 NCAA Division I men's basketball season. The Panthers, led by third-year head coach Byron Smith, play their home games at the William Nicks Building in Prairie View, Texas as members of the Southwestern Athletic Conference. They finished the season 22-13, to finish in 1st place. In the SWAC Tournament, they defeated Alcorn State, Grambling State, and Texas Southern to win the SWAC championship. Therefore, they received an automatic bid to the NCAA tournament as a 16th seed. However, they lost to fellow 16th seed Fairleigh Dickinson in the First Four.

Previous season
The Panthers finished the 2017–18 season 16–18, 12–6 in SWAC play to finish in a three-way tie for second place. Due to Grambling State's Academic Progress Rate violations and subsequent postseason ineligibility, the Panthers received the No. 2 seed in the SWAC tournament. They defeated Alcorn State in the quarterfinals before losing to Texas Southern in the semifinals.

Roster
Source:

Schedule and results
Source:

|-
!colspan=9 style=|Non-conference regular season

|-
!colspan=9 style=| SWAC regular season

|-
!colspan=9 style=| SWAC tournament

|-
!colspan=9 style=| NCAA tournament

References 

Prairie View A&M Panthers basketball seasons
Prairie View
Prairie View AandM basketball
Prairie View AandM basketball
Prairie View